Endeavour Forum (originally Women Who Want to be Women) is a conservative political organisation describing itself as "a Christian, pro-life, pro-family organisation that was founded to counter feminism, to defend the right to life of the unborn, and to support marriage and the natural family."  It was founded in 1979 by Babette Francis AM and has links to similar groups, such as the Australian Family Association and the World Congress of Families. It exerted strong influence on the Fraser government and the Queensland state government led by Sir Joh Bjelke-Petersen.

The Endeavour Forum is listed on the Australian National Women's Register as a lobby group and as a women's rights organisation.

Lobbying
The Endeavour Forum campaigns against abortion with Francis being the Australian representative of the Coalition on Abortion/Breast Cancer.

The Endeavour Forum has raised concerns regarding Islam in Australia and its radicalisation.

The organisation is a partner of the Coalition for Marriage in advancing the "No" case, associated with the Australian Marriage Law Postal Survey.

The Endeavour Forum's founder, Babette Francis, was appointed as a Member in the General Division of the Order of Australia (AM) by the Governor-General of Australia in the 2022 Queen's Birthday Honours List.

See also
 Australian Christian Lobby
 FamilyVoice Australia
 Marriage Alliance
 National Civic Council

References

External links
  Articles by Babette Francis

Religious organisations based in Australia
Christian advocacy groups
Christian organisations based in Australia
Organisations based in Melbourne
Anti-abortion organisations in Australia
Christian organizations established in 1979
1979 establishments in Australia
Women's organisations based in Australia